PMR -  British-American company providing market information, advice and services to international businesses interested in Central and Eastern Europe as well as other emerging markets. PMR's areas of operation include business publications, consultancy and market research.

PMR was founded in 1995 in Kraków, Poland.

Currently one of the largest companies of its type in the region.

PMR specializes in providing market information, advice and services to 
international businesses interested in Central 
and Eastern Europe as well as other emerging markets.
The areas include the following industries:
 Retail / FMCG, 
 Construction, 
 IT / Telecommunications, 
 Medical / Healthcare / Pharma
of Central and Eastern European countries.

PMR is a member of business organisations:
 European Society for Opinion & Marketing Research (ESOMAR)
 Strategic and Competitive Intelligence Professionals (SCIP)

References

Companies based in Kraków
Market research companies of Poland
Research and analysis firms